= Net Locality =

2011 book by Eric Gordon and Adriana de Souza e Silva

Net Locality: Why Location Matters in a Networked World
- 2011 first edition
- Author: Eric Gordan and Adriana de Souza e Silva
- Language: English
- Genre: Textbook
- Publisher: Wiley-Blackwell
- Publication date: 2011
- Publication place: United Kingdom
- Media type: Print (Paperback)
- Pages: 187
- ISBN: 978-1-4051-8060-3

Net Locality: Why Location Matters in a Networked World (2011) is a book written by Eric Gordon and Adriana de Souza e Silva. The book revolves around a brand new concept that Gordon and de Souza e Silva call Net Locality. Net Locality is locational awareness based on mobile technologies. This book delves deep into how individuals and societies interact with their environment when virtually everything thing they do is traceable and locatable.

== Contents ==
Chapter 1: Maps
Chapter 2: Mobile Annotations
Chapter 3: Social Networks and Games
Chapter 4: Urban Spaces
Chapter 5: Community
Chapter 6: Privacy
Chapter 7: Globalization
Chapter 8: Conclusion

== Criticism ==
While Eric Gordon and Adriana de Souza e Silva received praise from many, including Marcus Foth of Queensland University of Technology claiming that Net Locality brings back to life the idea that place still matters, the book is still up for debate on the dichotomy of the physical/virtual world. Allen Smith who works for WHERE had this to say about the writings, “I always thought about recent phone technology as allowing the internet to come out into the world and overlay it with information, I never thought of it the other way around, “extending the idea and functionality of location into the network.” Gordon replied to this by claiming that although the term "net-locality" is about the internet presence in everyday life, it is also true that our definition of networked interactions are changing from our perception of social norms and physical location.

== Bibliography ==
Gordon, Eric, and Adriana De Souza E Silva. Net Locality: Why Location Matters in a Networked World. Chichester, West Sussex: Wiley-Blackwell, 2011. Print.
